The Tin Machine Tour was a concert tour headlined by Anglo-American hard rock band Tin Machine. The tour commenced on 14 June 1989, following a performance of "Heaven's in Here" at the International Music Awards in New York City on 31 May 1989. It comprised 12 performances in six countries (USA, Denmark, Germany, Netherlands, France, United Kingdom) in venues with a capacity of 2,000 or less. Joined onstage by Kevin Armstrong, Tin Machine performed the entirety of their  eponymous debut album with the exception of "Video Crime," augmented with cover version of songs from Bob Dylan and Johnny Kidd & The Pirates.

Tour performance details
The band played in "fashionable black suits" in front of stark lighting in what was described as a departure from Bowie's previous tour. The 17 June show was added at the last minute when Bowie saw the long lines for tickets to 16 June's performance; the show was at midnight (technically the night of 16 June) and tickets were sold at half-price. For 24 June's performance in Amsterdam, video screens were erected outside the venue for those unable to obtain tickets. The video for "Maggie's Farm" was recorded at the same venue.

Live recordings
The 25 June performance at La Cigale, Paris was recorded with excerpts broadcast on Westwood One FM radio. Four songs from the same performance were released as b-sides to the 1989 singles; "Tin Machine" and "Prisoner of Love." 8 songs performed at this show were released digitally on the album Live at La Cigale, Paris, 25th June, 1989 in August 2019, to coincide with the album's 30th anniversary. The digital release was mastered by original album producer Tim Palmer.

Tour reviews
The Los Angeles Times had a positive review of Tin Machine's first show of the tour in New York City, saying "the band was full of life, raucous and brash, good-natured and smart."
Rolling Stone described fans who had gone to see "the Thin White Duke crooning 'Young Americans'" as receiving a rude awakening as Bowie offered "no oldies, no encores and no apologies." Reactions to the US shows were mixed as fans and critics felt that the proximity to Bowie was often more exciting than the music the band was playing. Ultimately, Rolling Stone magazine stated that it was Bowie's presence that "elevated the songs from the level of average grunge to that of theatrical avant-garage rock", and later said it helped Bowie regain some of the credibility he had lost during his previous album and tour.

Tour band
 David Bowie – vocals, guitar
 Reeves Gabrels – guitar
 Tony Sales – bass guitar, vocals
 Hunt Sales – drums, vocals
Additional musicians
 Kevin Armstrong – rhythm guitar, vocals (Blah Blah Blah, Tin Machine, Tin Machine II)

Tour dates
 14 June 1989 The World – New York City, United States
SET LIST: Sacrifice Yourself, Heaven's in Here, Amazing, Working Class Hero, Tin Machine, Sorry,Prisoner of Love, Bus Stop (country version), Bus Stop, I Can't Read, You've Been Around, BabyCan Dance, Run, Crack City, Pretty Thing, Under The God
 16 June 1989 The Roxy – Los Angeles, United States
SET LIST: Sacrifice Yourself, Heaven's in Here, Amazing, Working Class Hero, Tin Machine, Prisoner ofLove, Sorry, Bus Stop, Bus Stop (country version), Run, I Can't Read, Baby Can Dance, Pretty Thing,Crack City, Under The God
 17 June 1989 The Roxy – Los Angeles, California, United States
SET LIST: Sacrifice Yourself, Heaven's in Here, Working Class Hero, Sorry, Bus Stop (country version),Bus Stop, I Can't Read, Run, Pretty Thing, Crack City, Baby Can Dance, Under The God
 21 June 1989 Saga Rockteatre – Copenhagen, Denmark
SET LIST: Sacrifice Yourself, Heaven's in Here, Amazing, Working Class Hero, Tin Machine, Prisoner ofLove, Sorry, Bus Stop (country version), Bus Stop, Run, I Can't Read, Baby Can Dance, Pretty Thing,Crack City, Under The God
 22 June 1989 Docks – Hamburg, Germany
SET LIST: Amazing, Sacrifice Yourself, Heaven's in Here, Working Class Hero, Tin Machine, Sorry,Bus Stop, Bus Stop (country version), Run, Maggie's Farm, Baby Can Dance, I Can't Read, PrettyThing, Crack City, Under The God
 24 June 1989 Paradiso – Amsterdam, Netherlands
SET LIST: Amazing, Sacrifice Yourself, Heaven's in Here, Working Class Hero, Prisoner of Love,Tin Machine, Sorry, Bus Stop (country version), Bus Stop, Run, Maggie's Farm, I Can't Read,Baby Can Dance, Pretty Thing, Crack City, Under The God
 25 June 1989 La Cigale – Paris, France
SET LIST: Amazing, Heaven's in Here, Sacrifice Yourself, Working Class Hero, Prisoner of Love, TinMachine, Sorry, Bus Stop (country version), Bus Stop, Run, Maggie's Farm, I Can't Read, Baby CanDance, Pretty Thing, Crack City, Under The God
Opening Band : La Place (France)

Local Promoter : Alain Lahana 
 27 June 1989 The Town & Country Club – London, England
SET LIST: Amazing, Heaven's in Here, Sacrifice Yourself, Working Class Hero, Prisoner of Love, Sorry,Bus Stop, Run, Maggie's Farm, I Can't Read, Baby Can Dance, Pretty Thing, Crack City, Under The God
Opening Band : Jesus Jones (UK) 
 29 June 1989 National Ballroom – London, England
SET LIST: Bus Stop (country version), Bus Stop, Amazing, Working Class Hero, Sacrifice Yourself,Heaven's in Here, Prisoner of Love, Sorry, Now, Run, Baby Can Dance, Tin Machine, Maggie'sFarm, I Can't Read, Shakin' All Over, Pretty Thing, Crack City, Under The God
 1 July 1989 Newport Leisure Centre – Newport, Wales
SET LIST: Amazing, Heaven's in Here, Sacrifice Yourself, Working Class Hero, Prisoner of Love, Sorry,Bus Stop (country version), Bus Stop, Shakin' All Over, Run, Baby Can Dance, I Can't Read, Maggie'sFarm, Pretty Thing, Crack City, Under The God
 2 July 1989 St. George's Hall – Bradford, England
SET LIST: Now, Amazing, Heaven's in Here, Bus Stop (country version), Bus Stop, Working Class Hero,Prisoner of Love, Sacrifice Yourself, Sorry, Run, I Can't Read, Maggie's Farm, Tin Machine, Baby Can Dance, Shakin' All Over, Pretty Thing, Crack City, Under The God
 3 July 1989 The Forum – Livingston, Scotland
SET LIST: Amazing, Heaven's in Here, Working Class Hero, Shakin' All Over, Sorry, Sacrifice Yourself,Bus Stop (country version), Bus Stop, Run, I Can't Read, Maggie's Farm, Baby Can Dance, Tin Machine,Pretty Thing, Crack City, Under The God

The songs

From Tin Machine
 "Heaven's in Here"
 "Tin Machine" (Bowie, Reeves Gabrels, Hunt Sales, Tony Sales)
 "Prisoner of Love" (Bowie, Gabrels, H. Sales, T. Sales)
 "Crack City"
 "I Can't Read" (Bowie, Gabrels)
 "Under the God"
 "Amazing" (Bowie, Gabrels)
 "Working Class Hero" (originally from John Lennon/Plastic Ono Band (1970) by John Lennon; written by Lennon)
 "Bus Stop" (Bowie, Gabrels)
 "Pretty Thing"
 "Run" (Bowie, Kevin Armstrong)
 "Sacrifice Yourself" (Bowie, H. Sales, T. Sales)
 "Baby Can Dance"
From Tin Machine II
 "Sorry" (H. Sales)
From Black Tie White Noise
 "You've Been Around" (Bowie, Gabrels)
Other songs:
 "Maggie's Farm" (from Bringing It All Back Home (1965) by Bob Dylan; written by Dylan)
 "Now" (unreleased outtake from Tin Machine, written by Bowie and Armstrong, bookended with the "noise" segments of the 1988 remake of "Look Back in Anger", later rewritten as the title track of his 1995 album Outside)
 "Shakin' All Over" (originally a non-album single (1960) by Johnny Kidd and the Pirates; written by Johnny Kidd, later released as the B-side to "You Belong in Rock n' Roll")

Notes

References
 David Buckley, Strange Fascination: The Definitive Biography of David Bowie, Virgin Books, 1999, 

1989 concert tours
David Bowie concert tours